John Finlay Brown (18 May 1902 – 1977) was a Scottish footballer. His regular position was defender. Joining from Newtongrange Star where he had been a member of the team that dominated the Midlothian Junior League, he played for Dundee (his only club at the professional level) for a decade, featuring on the losing side in the 1925 Scottish Cup Final. He was selected once for the Scottish League XI in 1931. Following his departure from Dundee in 1934 it was speculated locally that he may join Darlington in England, but it appears this did not transpire.

In 1930, Brown was involved in an on-field collision with opponent Daniel McKenzie of Aberdeen, who later died from his injuries a year later, aged 22.

References

1902 births
1977 deaths
Scottish footballers
Sportspeople from Midlothian
Dundee F.C. players
Newtongrange Star F.C. players
Scottish Junior Football Association players
Scottish Football League players
Scottish Football League representative players
Date of death missing
Association football defenders